Quixaba is a city  in the state of Pernambuco, Brazil. The population in 2020, according with IBGE was 6,805 inhabitants and the total area is 210.71 km².

Geography

 State - Pernambuco
 Region - Sertão Pernambucano
 Boundaries - Paraiba state    (N and W);  Flores    (S);  Carnaíba   (E).
 Area - 209.96 km²
 Elevation - 625 m
 Hydrography - Pajeú River
 Vegetation - Caatinga hiperxerófila
 Climate - semi arid - (Sertão) hot
 Annual average temperature - 23.5 c
 Distance to Recife - 416 km

Economy

The main economic activities in Quixaba are agribusiness, especially creation of cattle, sheep, goats,  chickens;  and plantations of beans and corn.

Economic Indicators

Economy by Sector
2006

Health Indicators

References

Municipalities in Pernambuco